The Curse of Bridge Hollow is a 2022 American comedy horror film directed by Jeff Wadlow from a screenplay by Todd Berger and Robert Rugan. Starring Marlon Wayans, Priah Ferguson, Kelly Rowland, John Michael Higgins, Lauren Lapkus, Rob Riggle, and Nia Vardalos, the film was released by Netflix on October 14, 2022.

Plot

When Stingy Jack brings Halloween decorations to life, a Brooklyn transplant and her dad must save their small New England town.

Cast
 Marlon Wayans as Howard Gordon
 Priah Ferguson as Sydney Gordon
 Kelly Rowland as Emily Gordon
 John Michael Higgins as Principal Floyd
 Lauren Lapkus as Mayor Tammy Rice
 Rob Riggle as Sully
 Nia Vardalos as Madam Hawthorne
 Abi Monterey as Ramona
 Holly J. Barrett as Jamie
 Myles Vincent Perez as Mario
 Helen Slayton-Hughes as Victoria

Reception
On Rotten Tomatoes the film holds an approval rating of 46% based on 26 reviews, with an average rating of 5/10. On Metacritic, the film has a weighted average score of 38 out of 100 based on 10 critics, indicating "generally unfavorable reviews".

References

External links
 The Curse of Bridge Hollow on Netflix
 

2022 films
Films directed by Jeff Wadlow
Films scored by Christopher Lennertz
English-language Netflix original films
2020s English-language films
2020s American films
American children's fantasy films
American comedy horror films
American dark fantasy films
American films about Halloween
American monster movies
American haunted house films
American supernatural horror films
American zombie comedy films
Children's horror films
Films about curses
Halloween adventure films
Halloween horror films